(born 1930) is a Japanese vertebrate palaeontologist and honorary museum director. The Pleistocene anatid Shiriyanetta hasegawai was named in his honour, in recognition of his "outstanding contributions" to the field.

Biography
Born in Iida, Nagano Prefecture in 1930, Hasegawa graduated from Yokohama National University in 1955, earning his doctorate from the University of Tokyo with a study of Palaeoloxodon naumanni in 1972. Part-time lecturer at various times at Yokohama National University, the University of Tokyo, Hiroshima University, Kyoto University, Nagoya University, Shizuoka University, Tohoku University, and the University of the Ryukyus, as well as Researcher and Senior Researcher at the National Science Museum, Tokyo, from 1979 until his retirement in 1995 he was Professor at Yokohama National University. In 1996, he became the first director of Gunma Museum of Natural History. He has also contributed to the operations and displays at Iida City Museum, Iwaki City Coal & Fossil Museum, Kanagawa Prefectural Museum of Natural History, Kitakyushu Museum of Natural History, and Natural History Museum and Institute, Chiba. Internationally, he has been involved in research in Europe, the Americas, Madagascar, Ethiopia, the Soviet Union, China, South Korea, and Australia. His work has had a particular emphasis on dinosaurs and palaeornithology.

See also
 Taxa described by Hasegawa Yoshikazu

References

Japanese paleontologists
1930 births
People from Iida, Nagano
Yokohama National University alumni
University of Tokyo alumni
Living people